Lituya Mountain is a peak in the Fairweather Range of Alaska, United States, south of Mount Fairweather. Its eastern slopes feed a branch of the Johns Hopkins Glacier, which flows into Glacier Bay. On its western side is a large cirque, shared with Mount Fairweather, Mount Quincy Adams, and Mount Salisbury, which heads the Fairweather Glacier; this flows almost to the Pacific coast at Cape Fairweather. The Lituya Glacier flows from the south side of the mountain into Lituya Bay on the Pacific coast.

Though not exceptional in terms of absolute elevation, Lituya Mountain does possess great vertical relief over local terrain.

Lituya Mountain is not often climbed, partly due to its proximity to the higher and better-known Mount Fairweather, and partly due to difficult access and bad weather in the Fairweather Range.

The Lituya name was published in 1852 as G(ora) L'tua, meaning "Lituya Mountain" in Russian by Mikhail Tebenkov of the Imperial Russian Navy.

History

1958 earthquake

On July 9, 1958, an earthquake along the Fairweather Fault loosened about 40 million cubic yards of rock above Lituya Bay. The edge located to the west of the Gilbert Inlet at the bottom of the Lituya Glacier (point opposite to the rock impact in the water) was the most affected place.

2012 landslide
On June 11, 2012, there was another enormous landslide at the base of the mountain. Other than registering as a magnitude 3.4 quake, it went unnoticed for a month until discovered by a pilot flying over the glacier.

See also
Barry Arm landslide – another major landslide in Alaska

References

External links

 Lituya Mountain on Topozone
 Lituya Mountain on bivouac.com
 World's Biggest Tsunami: The largest recorded tsunami with a wave 1720 feet tall in Lituya Bay, Alaska

2012 in Alaska
Landforms of Hoonah–Angoon Census Area, Alaska
Landslides in 2012
Landslides in the United States
Mountains of Glacier Bay National Park and Preserve
Mountains of Unorganized Borough, Alaska
Natural disasters in Alaska
Saint Elias Mountains